Five pence may refer to:
Five pence (British coin), a decimal subdivision of the pound sterling
Five pence (Irish coin), a decimal subdivision of the now withdrawn Irish pound